The Falls of Rough Historic District, along Kentucky Route 110 in Falls of Rough, Kentucky, is a  historic district which was listed on the National Register of Historic Places in 1978.  It included 10 contributing buildings, a contributing structure, and three contributing sites.

At its peak during 1900–1930, Falls of Rough was "a small but thriving western Kentucky town of around 250 inhabitants. It consisted of a complex of buildings that included a grist mill (c. 1830), a sawmill, a mill (c. 1890), a general store (c. 1880), a post office (c. 1905), a church
(c. 1890) and parsonage, and the Green farm all built by the Green family." The district includes remnants of some of these.  Another name proposed for the district was the "Green Family Farm Historic District".

The "visual center" of the district is the brick Willis Green House, built in 1830 and extensively modified in 1879.  Its front facade brick is laid in Flemish bond;  it rests upon a stone foundation.

The contributing structure in the district is an arch beam iron bridge spanning the Rough River, linking the Breckinridge County and Grayson County sides of the district.

References

Historic districts on the National Register of Historic Places in Kentucky
Gothic Revival architecture in Kentucky
Victorian architecture in Kentucky
Buildings and structures completed in 1830
National Register of Historic Places in Breckinridge County, Kentucky
National Register of Historic Places in Grayson County, Kentucky
1830 establishments in Kentucky